4:21 ...The Day After is the fourth studio album by American rapper and Wu-Tang Clan member Method Man. The album was released on August 29, 2006 by Def Jam Recordings, to mostly positive reviews. The album features guest appearances from Fat Joe, Styles P, Redman, and various Wu-Tang Clan members. Production is handled by RZA, Havoc, Kwamé, Erick Sermon and Scott Storch, amongst others. U-God appears in the song "The Glide" but isn't credited.

Background
In regard to RZA's contributions to the album, Method Man explained:

"RZA was the first name I said when I spoke to Jay Z, when he signed off on the album budget. I’m happy with the outcome, but I think RZA could have had a little bit more input, but he was busy at the time."

"This is just more RZA on production, shit like that. But some of the shit I couldn't do, because some of these producers were screaming out these niggas want a $100,000 for a track. Fuck that! Kiss my ass. I'm not paying nobody a $100,000 for shit, unless I can live in that mothafucka."

Method Man explained the album's title:

"The national weed smoking day is 4/20, so I named my album 4/21 the day after. Because after that day, you have this moment of clarity when you’re not high and you see things clearly."

Commercial performance
 4:21... The Day After debuted at number eight on the US Billboard 200 chart, selling 62,000 copies in its first week. It serves as Method Man's fifth consecutive top-ten album in the United States.

Track listing

Personnel
Credits for 4:21... The Day After adapted from AllMusic.

 Chris Athens – Mastering
 Rob Caiaffa – Marketing
 Mike Chav – Engineer, Mixing
 Carol Corless – Package Production
 Armon Davis – Keyboards
 Mike Dupus – Engineer, Mixing
 James Ellis – Management
 R. "Skane" Ford – A&R
 Havoc – Producer
 Terese Joseph – A&R Assistance
 Gimel Keaton – Engineer, Mixing
 Kinetic – Producer
 Lil O – Engineer
 Tai Linzie – Art Coordinator, Photo Coordination
 Glen Marchese – Mixing
 Patrick McGee – Engineer

 Method Man – Executive Producer
 Ayinde "Tike" Olubayo – Engineer
 Jose "Choco" Reynoso – Engineer, Mixing
 Megan Rochell – Performer
 Justin Rossi – Engineer
 RZA – Arranger, Vocals, Producer, Executive Producer, Mixing
 Ken Schles – Photography
 Erick Sermon – Arranger, Producer, Executive Producer
 Scott Storch – Producer
 Conrad "Con Da Don" Golding - Engineer
 Aaron "Franchise" Fishbein - Electric Guitar and Bass
 David "Gordo" Strickland – Engineer
 Supa Engineer "Dura" – Mixing
 Dan Tobiason – Mixing Assistant
 Andrew "Versatile" Roettger – Producer
 Alli Truch – Creative Director
 Erni Vales – Illustrations
 Dawud West – Art Direction, Design

Charts

References

Method Man albums
2006 albums
Albums produced by Mr. Porter
Albums produced by Erick Sermon
Albums produced by Havoc (musician)
Albums produced by RZA
Albums produced by Scott Storch
Def Jam Recordings albums
Albums produced by Andrew Roettger